Schober Pass (el. 849 m.) is a high mountain pass in the Austrian Alps, located in the Bundesland of Styria.

See also
 List of highest paved roads in Europe
 List of mountain passes

Mountain passes of the Alps
Mountain passes of Styria